Ballyduff Lower GAA is a Gaelic Athletic Association club based in Ballyduff Lower, County Waterford, Ireland.  The club enters teams in both the Waterford Intermediate Hurling Championship and the Waterford Intermediate Football Championship.

Underage
Ballyduff reformed an underage club in 2008 and fielded teams for the first time since 1992.

Honours
Waterford Senior Hurling Championships: 2
 1906, 1970(Ballyduff/Portlaw)
Waterford Senior Football Championships: 1
 1887
 Munster Junior Club Hurling Championship 
 Runner-Up 2016
 Waterford Intermediate Hurling Championship: (1)
 2000  | Runner-Up 1998, 2020
 Waterford Intermediate Football Championship: (0)
 Runner-Up 1983, 2009
 Waterford Junior Hurling Championship: (4)
 1961, 1983, 1997, 2016   | Runner-Up 1925, 1955, 1960
 Waterford Junior Football Championship (4)
 1968 (with Portlaw), 1974, 2003, 2019 | Runner-Up 2016
 Waterford Minor Hurling Championship (0)
 Runner-Up 1960 (with Portlaw)
  Waterford Minor Football Championship (0)
 Winner 1999 (with Butlerstown)

References

Gaelic games clubs in County Waterford
Hurling clubs in County Waterford
Gaelic football clubs in County Waterford